Al Ubaidi (or Al Obaidi) is a town in the Al Anbar Governorate of Iraq.

It is an Iraqi city situated along the south side of Euphrates River near the Syrian border. It is a subdistrict of Al Qa'im and contains both New Ubaydi and Old Ubaydi as well as a number of smaller villages that stretch down the Euphrates to the east.

During the Iraq War, the city was patrolled by United States Marines, and was the location of a forward operating base, a US military base, as well as several battle positions.

Following Operation Steel Curtain, in which US Marines and Iraqi Army units swept the city of insurgents, the streets were secured by a combination of Iraqi Army and Marine forces.

Old Ubaydi is the stronghold of the Al-Bu Mahal tribe, who was the first tribe in the region to openly cooperate with coalition forces and fight the insurgency. New Ubaydi is a modern style city, complete with city planning. It was built to support the workers of the Al Qaim Phosphate plant, which is located to the south west of Ubaydi. The villages to the east that fall under Ubaydi's jurisdiction are made of a mix of tribes including Mahal, Rawi, and Salmani. These villages are mostly made of farmers and fishermen.

Ubaydi has a functioning city council and mayor and a fully operational police force.

Islamic State of Iraq and the Levant captured the city in 2014. The Iraqi Army later recaptured the city in November 2017.

References

 http://isis.liveuamap.com/en/2017/23-november-shaikhan-sheikha-malha-sabeeha-ali-almani-arab

Populated places in Al Anbar Governorate